Inspector Eagle is a Hindi-language action drama film directed by Vishwamitter Adil and produced by Laxminarayan Khanna. The film was released on 9 February 1979 under the banner of Navprabhat Pictures.

Cast

 Sanjeev Kumar as Inspector Eagle	
 Neelam Mehra as Shilpi
 Bindu as Ruhi
 Goga Kapoor as Goga
 A.K. Hangal as Anthony Pinto
 Yunus Parvez as Police Constable Naik
 Ranjeet as Rakesh
 Mac Mohan as Solanki, Guitarwala
 Paintal
Shivraj as John Chacha

References

External links 
 

1979 films
1970s Hindi-language films
Films scored by Madan Mohan
Indian action drama films